Michael L. Tolkin (born October 17, 1950) is an American filmmaker and novelist. He has written numerous screenplays, including The Player (1992), which he adapted from his own 1988 novel of the same name, and for which he received the Edgar Award for Best Motion Picture Screenplay (1993) and was nominated for the Academy Award for Best Adapted Screenplay. He later wrote a follow-up to the novel, titled The Return of the Player, which was published in 2006.

In 2018, Tolkin served as co-creator of the miniseries Escape at Dannemora with Brett Johnson. The series was based on the real-life 2015 Clinton Correctional Facility escape that led to a massive manhunt for two escaped convicts in upstate New York. In 2022, he served as creator of the miniseries The Offer, which centered on the development of the 1972 film The Godfather.

Biography 
Tolkin was born to a Romanian-Jewish and Ukrainian-Jewish family in New York City, New York, the son of Edith (née Leibovitch), a studio executive and film industry lawyer, and the late comedy writer Mel Tolkin.

He is a 1974 graduate of Middlebury College.

Tolkin lives in Los Angeles with his wife, author Wendy Mogel. They have two daughters, Susanna and Emma.

Filmography

Film

Uncredited writing roles
 The Haunting  (1999)
 Domestic Disturbance (2001)
 Dawn of the Dead  (2004)
 The Punisher (2004)

Television
TV series

TV movies

Bibliography 
 bed master (1988)
 The Player (1988)
 Among the Dead (1993)
 Under Radar (2003)
 The Return of the Player (2006)
 NK3 (2017)

References

External links

1950 births
20th-century American novelists
21st-century American novelists
20th-century American male writers
21st-century American male writers
American male novelists
American male screenwriters
Bard College alumni
Best Adapted Screenplay BAFTA Award winners
Edgar Award winners
Living people
Middlebury College alumni
Writers from New York City
Writers Guild of America Award winners
American people of Romanian-Jewish descent
American people of Ukrainian-Jewish descent
Novelists from New York (state)
Film directors from New York City
Screenwriters from New York (state)